Insert Name Here is a BBC comedy panel game television show that began in 2016. It is presented by Sue Perkins and features Josh Widdicombe and Richard Osman as team captains. Each episode comprises the two teams of three competing to answer questions about famous people, past and present, who share the same first name or any similar derived name; for example the first episode was titled Frank but Sue said questions will also be asked on people called Francis, Frankie and Fanny. The first episode premiered on BBC Two on 4 January 2016. As of 27 February 2019, 28 episodes have been produced and broadcast across four series, including three Christmas specials. The show was canceled in February 2020 due to low viewership.

Key
 The column headed "Overall" contains the episode number for the whole show, while the column headed "No." contains the episode number within that series.
 The number in the "Viewers " column are sourced from the Broadcasters' Audience Research Board (BARB).
  indicates the viewing figures for this episode were outside the Top 30 for the week
  indicates the viewing figures have not been released for the week the episode aired 
  Episodes with this background were won by Josh Widdicombe's team
  Episodes with this background were won by Richard Osman's team

Episodes

Series 1 (2016)

Series 2 (2016–17)

Series 3 (2017–18)

Series 4 (2018–19)

Scores

Notes

References

External links

BBC-related lists
Lists of British comedy television series episodes
Lists of British non-fiction television series episodes